Salvation is a 2008 Australian film directed by Paul Cox and starring Wendy Hughes and Bruce Myles.

Cox was inspired to make the film after seeing a televangelist on TV late at night asking for money for a facelift.

Reception
The film received mixed reviews.

References

External links

Salvation at Paul Cox's website

2008 films
Australian drama films
Films directed by Paul Cox
2000s English-language films
2000s Australian films